Arctotis stoechadifolia, the African daisy or white arctotis, is a rare species of South African  plants in the family Asteraceae. It is a rare plant found only in sand dunes along the west coast of Cape Province.

The species is sometimes regarded as the same species as the much more common and widely cultivated A. venusta, but authors separate the two as distinct species.

References

External links
Jepson Manual Treatment
African Plants Profile

stoechadifolia
Endemic flora of South Africa
Flora of the Cape Provinces
Fynbos
Garden plants of Southern Africa
Taxa named by Peter Jonas Bergius